The year 1901 in archaeology involved some significant events.

Events
 British School at Rome established.

Excavations
 KV44 at the Valley of the Kings, Egypt by Howard Carter and Donald P. Ryan.
 Excavations and renovations at Mitla conducted by Leopoldo Batres.
 Excavation of the Minoan town at Gournia by Harriet Boyd-Hawes and Blanche Wheeler Williams begins (continues to 1904).

Finds
 December: Code of Hammurabi at Susa.
Ivory Bangle Lady in York, England, the skeleton and grave goods of a later fourth century high-status, possibly Christian, inhabitant of Eboracum, much later identified as of mixed race.

Publications

Miscellaneous
 Edward Herbert Thompson buys the ruins of Chichen Itza for 75 United States dollars
 General Land Office special agent S. J. Holsinger recommends creating a national park to preserve archaeological sites in Chaco Canyon

Births
February 15 – André Parrot, French archaeologist of the Near East (d. 1980)
July 17 – Theresa Goell, American archaeologist of the Near East (d. 1985)
October 18 – A. Ledyard Smith, American archaeologist of the Americas (d. 1985)
October 27 – Aage Roussell, Danish archaeologist of Greenland (d. 1972)
Charles Green, English archaeologist (d. 1972)

Deaths
 May 10 – Christian Maclagan, Scottish antiquary (b. 1811)

References

Archaeology
Archaeology
Archaeology by year